Younes Latifi (born 5 February 1984), better known by his stage name Mister You, is a French rapper of Moroccan descent known for his freestyles.

Career
Born in Paris, he was raised in the Belleville area of the capital city. He lived in the south of France trying to make a career in music. His first official album was in December 2009 entitled Présumé coupable (meaning Presumed guilty). When in 2009, the French police issued a warrant for assistance in his arrest, he gave an interview in October 2009 daring them to stop him. He accompanied that with a defiant underground indie album entitled Arrête You si tu peux (meaning Catch You if you can in French).

Mister You has released new materials including mixtape and street album M.D.R. (or Mec De Rue) that incorporated cooperations with various rappers like Bruler & LaCrim, Tunisiano, Zesau and others and was released on 25 October 2010. It proved to be his biggest commercial success reaching #9 on the official French Albums Chart. Based on that success, he released a music video for "Les p'tits de chez moi", in duo with Mimma Mendhy.  

ON 31 October 2011, Mister You has released his third album "Dans ma grotte". The first single from the album was "Mets-toi à l'aise" featuring Colonel Reyel followed by "J'regarde en l'air".

Discography

Albums

EPs
2009: Prise d'Otage

Mixtapes, others

Singles

*Did not appear in the official Belgian Ultratop 50 charts, but rather in the bubbling under Ultratip charts.

Non charting
2010: "Lettre à un traitre"
2010: "Quand on était petit" (feat. Nessbeal)
2010: "Les p'tits de chez moi"
2011: "Mal bien acquis profite toujours"
2011: "La mouche"
2012: "Pas d'love" feat. Sana

Featured in

*Did not appear in the official Belgian Ultratop 50 charts, but rather in the bubbling under Ultratip charts.

References

External links
Mister You Gataga official website
Mister You page on Skyrock website

French rappers
Moroccan rappers
Rappers from Paris
1984 births
Musicians from Paris
Living people
French people of Moroccan descent
French male singers